The Congress Weekly magazine was a periodical, published in New York, by the American Jewish Congress.

The magazine was "a review of Jewish interests.". It was founded in the 1930s.

Samuel Caplan was its editor from 1940 till 1966.

Among its contributors was author, poet Judd L. Teller.

The Congress weekly magazine became a bi-weekly in 1959, known as Congress bi-weekly magazine.

It later (at least since 1975) became a monthly magazine, Congress Monthly, with articles on public policy and public affairs.

References 

Publications established in the 1930s
Magazines published in New York (state)
Weekly magazines published in the United States